The following is a list of episodes for the 1961–1962 cartoon series The Yogi Bear Show. All the episodes were produced and directed by William Hanna and Joseph Barbera.

With the exception of the last episode, each episode consists of a Yogi Bear cartoon, a Snagglepuss cartoon, and a Yakky Doodle cartoon.

Series overview

Episodes

 Cartoons:
 YB = Yogi Bear
 SP = Snagglepuss
 YD = Yakky Doodle
 No. = Overall episode number
 Ep = Episode number by season

Season 1 (1961)

Season 2 (1961–1962)

References
 Episode index at The Big Cartoon DataBase

Yogi Bear episodes
Yogi Bear Show